Ecclesia in Oceania is a post-synodal apostolic exhortation written by Pope John Paul II, published on 22 November 2001. It follows the 1998 Special Assembly for Oceania of the Synod of Bishops.

References

External links 

 

Apostolic exhortations
2001 documents
Documents of Pope John Paul II
2001 in Christianity
Catholicism in Oceania